Charlotte Guest may refer to:
Lady Charlotte Guest (1812–1895), English aristocrat and businesswoman
Charlie Guest (born 1993), British alpine skier